German submarine U-375 was a Type VIIC U-boat built for Nazi Germany's Kriegsmarine for service during World War II.
She was laid down on 14 March 1940 by Howaldtswerke in Kiel as yard number 6, launched on 7 June 1941 and commissioned on 19 July 1941 under Kapitänleutnant  Jürgen Koenenkamp.

Design
German Type VIIC submarines were preceded by the shorter Type VIIB submarines. U-375 had a displacement of  when at the surface and  while submerged. She had two shafts and two  propellers.

U-375 was fitted with five  torpedo tubes (four fitted at the bow and one at the stern), fourteen torpedoes, one  SK C/35 naval gun, 220 rounds, and a  C/30 anti-aircraft gun. The boat had a complement of between forty-four and sixty.

Service history
The boat's service began on 19 July 1941 with training as part of the 5th U-boat Flotilla. She was transferred to the 3rd Flotilla on 1 November 1941 for active service, followed by a transfer to 29th Flotilla on 1 January 1942 in the Mediterranean.

Fate
U-375 has been missing since 25 July 1943 in the Mediterranean Sea south of Sicily. All hands were lost.

Previously recorded fate
U-375 was thought to have been sunk after being depth charged by USN submarine chaser PC-624 on 30 July 1943 at position  in the Mediterranean NW of Malta. All hands were lost. This attack was actually against Italian submarine Velella, inflicting no damage.

Summary of raiding history

See also
 Mediterranean U-boat Campaign (World War II)

References

Notes

Citations

Bibliography

External links

German Type VIIC submarines
Ships lost with all hands
1941 ships
U-boats commissioned in 1941
U-boats sunk in 1943
Missing U-boats of World War II
World War II submarines of Germany
World War II shipwrecks in the Mediterranean Sea
Ships built in Kiel
Maritime incidents in July 1943